Newport is a home rule-class city at the confluence of the Ohio and Licking rivers in Campbell County, Kentucky. The population was 15,273 at the 2010 census. Historically, it was one of four county seats of Campbell County. Newport is a major urban center of Northern Kentucky and part of the Cincinnati metropolitan area, which includes over two million residents.

History

Newport was settled  by James Taylor Jr. on land purchased by his father James Sr. from George Muse, who received it as a grant. Taylor's brother, Hubbard Taylor, had been mapping the land twenty years prior. It was not named for its position on the river but for Christopher Newport, the commander of the first ship to reach Jamestown, Virginia, in 1607. Newport was established as a town on December 14, 1795, and incorporated as a city on February 24, 1834. In 1803, the Ft. Washington military post was moved from Cincinnati to become the Newport Barracks. A bridge first connected Newport to Covington in 1853, and the first bridge spanning the Ohio River to Cincinnati, the John A. Roebling Suspension Bridge, opened in 1866. Newport experienced large German immigration in the 1880-90s.

By 1900, Newport was the third largest city in Kentucky, after Covington and Louisville, although Newport and Covington were rightly considered satellites of Cincinnati.

Prohibition under the Volstead Act of 1919 resulted in a widespread illegal sale of alcohol. Many gangsters began to smuggle alcohol into the city to supply citizens and businesses. Speakeasies, bribery, and corruption became a norm in Newport. A well known Newport crime boss was gambler and National Crime Syndicate member Ed Levinson.  

Newport's worst natural disaster occurred in 1937, when a flood covered a great part of the city. A flood wall was completed in 1948, and remains a significant part of Newport's landscape.

Newport once had the reputation of "Sin City" due to its upscale gambling casinos on Monmouth street. Monmouth also had many men's stores, restaurants, and ice cream parlors. Investigations for racketeering pushed out the casinos, which were replaced by peep shows and adult strip clubs. Many of the old businesses disappeared when parking became difficult on Monmouth Street and the commercial district opened on the hill of south Newport.

A garage at 938 John Street manufacturing illegal fireworks exploded without warning in 1981, leaving severe damage up to a six-block radius.

In the 1980s and 1990s, Newport made plans to develop its riverfront and core to focus primarily on "family friendly" tourism, instead of the "Sin City" tourism of the past. In May 1999 the $40-million Newport Aquarium opened, and the historic Posey Flats apartments were leveled in favor of the Newport on the Levee entertainment complex, which opened the following year.

In 1997 plans for a  structure called the "Millennium Tower" were revealed. The tower's main selling point was that building it would be financed by private money, as opposed to taxpayer money. Mick Nelson also heads up the expo at the levee in Newport. The tower was expected to be completed by 2003, but investors later pulled out and no construction was done. Today the site for the tower is a parking lot next to the World Peace Bell.

Today, Newport is becoming the entertainment community of the fast-growing Northern Kentucky area while its neighboring cities—Bellevue and Covington—become the business centers.

Timeline

 1791 - Settlement laid out.
 1795 - Town of Newport incorporated.
 1796 - Campbell County Courthouse built.
 1798 - Newport Academy founded.
 1800 - Population: 106.
 1804 - Newport Barracks established.
 1812 - James Taylor mansion built.
 1821 - Southgate house built (approximate date).
 1831 - Taylor Methodist Episcopal Church built.
 1834 - City of Newport chartered.
 1836 - Newport Lyceum founded.
 1844 - Silk factory begins operating.
 1847 - Public school begins operating.
 1850 - Washington Fire Engine and Hose Company (volunteer firefighters) established.
 1859 - October 28: "Mob destroys the plant of the True South, abolition paper."
 1860
 Public high school begins operating.
 Population: 10,046.
 1866 - John A. Roebling Suspension Bridge opens near Newport.
 1869 - John Butcher Brewery (later Wiedemann) in business.
 1870 - Population: 15,087.
 1871 - St. Paul's Episcopal Church built.
 1872 - Newport and Cincinnati Bridge opens.
 1873 - Southgate St. School established.
 1880 – Population: 20,433.
 1883 - Ohio River flood.
 1884
 Ohio River flood.
 Campbell County Courthouse rebuilt.
 1888 - U.S. military Fort Thomas established near Newport.
 1890 - Cincinnati–Newport Bridge opens.
 1891
 Andrews Steel Mill in business.
 George Ahlering elected mayor.
 1898 - Ohio River flood.
 1900 - Population: 28,301.
 1902 - Carnegie Free Library opens.
 1910 - Population: 30,309.
 1913 - Ohio River flood.
 1921 - Steel worker labor strike begins.
 1924 - Cote Brilliante becomes part of Newport.
 1927 - Newport Finance Building constructed.
 1930 - City-manager form of government adopted.
 1935 - Clifton becomes part of Newport.
 1936 - Ingalls Park becomes part of Newport.
 1937 - Flood.
 1948 - Floodwall built.
 1955 – The all-boys Newport Catholic High School opens a new campus on Carothers Road. The facility remains in use today by its coeducational successor, Newport Central Catholic High School. 
 1956 - Newport Shopping Center in business.
 1961
 Anti-corruption "Committee of 500" formed.
 George Ratterman becomes county sheriff.
 1973 - Regional Transit Authority of Northern Kentucky (public transit) established.
 1975 - Newport News begins publication.
 1976 - Daniel Carter Beard Bridge opens.
 1978 - Campbell County Public Library established.
 1980
 Irene Deaton becomes first female mayor of Newport.
 Mansion Hill designated an historic district.
 1983
 Steve Goetz elected mayor.
 Newport Central Catholic High School is created by the merger of the all-boys Newport Catholic High School and all-girls Our Lady of Providence Academy. 
 1990 - Campbell County Historical Society founded.
 1992 - Tom Guidugli becomes mayor.
 1995 - Taylor–Southgate Bridge opens.
 1999 - Newport Aquarium opens.
 2000 - Population: 17,048.
 2001 - Newport on the Levee "entertainment complex" in business.
 2004 - L&N Bridge pedestrianized.
 2005 - Geoff Davis becomes U.S. representative for Kentucky's 4th congressional district.
 2008 - Jerry Peluso elected mayor.
 2010 - Population: 15,273.
 2012 - Thomas Massie becomes U.S. representative for Kentucky's 4th congressional district.
 2021 - Thomas Guidugli, Jr elected mayor

County seat

Newport is a county seat of Campbell County, and was previously a county seat from 1797 until 1823, and again from 1824 until 1840.
In the 19th century, the overwhelming majority of the population lived in Newport and the surrounding cities. Many citizens did not like traveling south to Alexandria to conduct county business, as southern Campbell County was primarily undeveloped.

In 1883, Newport successfully lobbied the state legislature for an exception to state law, which both required that a county seat be located in the center of the county, and that certain county business only be conducted at the county seat. Frankfort passed a special law, creating the Newport Court House District, and within that district, the Newport Courthouse Commission which functioned as a special taxing district, so that an additional courthouse could be built, and business could take place in Newport, in addition to Alexandria. In 2008, the Kentucky General Assembly removed the taxing authority from the Courthouse Commission, but left the District and Commission intact.

In 2009, a court ruled that Alexandria is the only county seat, and Newport is not a county seat. On November 24, 2010, the Kentucky Court of Appeals disagreed, and granted Newport equal status as a county seat. On August 25, 2011, the Supreme Court of Kentucky denied review of the appellate decision.

Geography

Newport is located at  (39.088661, −84.490206).

Newport is located within the Bluegrass region found in the Upland South of the United States of America. Newport is also commonly referred to as being located in the Midwest. Either description of Upland South or Midwest is acceptable, as Newport is located at the boundary between those regions.

Climate

Newport is located within a transition zone and is proximal to the extreme northern limit of the humid subtropical climate of the Southeastern United States.

Demographics

As of the census of 2010, there were 15,273 people, 6,194 households, and 3,273 families residing in the city. The racial makeup of the city was 86.3% White, 7.6% African American, 0.3% Native American, 0.7% Asian, less than 0.01% Pacific Islander, 1.8% from other races, and 3.2% from two or more races. Hispanic or Latino of any race were 4.1% of the population.

There were 6,194 households, out of which 23.3% had children under the age of 18 living with them, 28.7% were married couples living together, 17.3% had a female householder with no husband present, and 47.2% were non-families. 37.0% of all households were made up of individuals, and 8.9% had someone living alone who was 65 years of age or older. The average household size was 2.32 and the average family size was 3.09.

In the city the population was spread out, with 22.2% under the age of 18, 11.1% from 18 to 24, 31.2% from 25 to 44, 25.1% from 45 to 64, and 10.4% who were 65 years of age or older. The median age was 34 years. For every 100 females, there were 94.8 males. For every 100 females age 18 and over, there were 91.4 males.

The median income for a household in the city was $27,451, and the median income for a family was $32,858. Males had a median income of $29,337 versus $22,723 for females. The per capita income for the city was $15,207. About 20.7% of families and 22.3% of the population were below the poverty line, including 31.1% of those under age 18 and 16.3% of those age 65 or over.

Education

Newport Public Schools are part of the Newport Independent Schools School District. The district has one elementary school, one intermediate school, one middle school, and one high school.
Newport is also home to a Catholic private high school, Newport Central Catholic is a coed private Catholic school in central Newport which has been operating for over 100 years. 
Newport has a public library, a branch of the Campbell County Public Library.

Economy

Local TV is based in Newport.

Media
A pivotal scene (in which the autistic character Raymond Babbitt counts the toothpicks) in the 1988 film Rain Man was filmed in Newport at Pompilio's Italian restaurant. Scenes from the Netflix original movie Extremely Wicked, Shockingly Evil and Vile (2019) were filmed in Newport. The scenes from Extremely Wicked, Shockingly Evil and Vile (2019) showcase parts of Monmonuth Street, Pepper Pod, and Newport's historic court house. A scene from the 2011 political thriller The Ides of March was shot in Newport. The scene (in which Molly Stearns overdoses) was shot at the Comfort Inn located at 420 Riverboat Row facing downtown Cincinnati across the Dan C Beard Bridge in Kentucky.

Notable people
Dave Cowens, NBA center, member of the Basketball Hall of Fame
John Alexander, actor known for his portrayal of Teddy Brewster in Arsenic and Old Lace both on Broadway and in the 1944 film starring Cary Grant
Brent Spence, Democratic Congressman, attorney, and banker from Northern Kentucky

See also
 List of cities and towns along the Ohio River
 Newport Central Catholic High School

References

Bibliography

 
 
 
 1883 ed.
 
 
  (+ Chronology)

External links

 
 City website
 Historical Images and Texts of Newport
 History of Newport
 

 
Cities in Campbell County, Kentucky
Kentucky populated places on the Ohio River
Populated places established in 1791
1791 establishments in Virginia 
Cities in Kentucky
County seats in Kentucky